The Old Bar (2001) is a bar and live music venue on the premises of 74–76 Johnston St, between Brunswick and Nicholson streets, in Fitzroy, an inner city suburb of Melbourne, Victoria, Australia.

The venue currently operates 7 days a week with performances most nights, often at no cost during the week. Residencies are also a regular occurrence at the venue, with a band playing one particular night of the week for the duration of a month, usually with different support acts each time.

History
The buildings on the site were constructed around the turn of the 20th century, appearing in postal records from 1903/04. Original uses for the buildings varied over the years from various manufacturing enterprises, a dairy, haberdashery and clothing stores, as well as cafes and restaurants. In 2001, the venue opened as The Old Bar, under the management of Andy Tannahill, until ownership passed to Paul Jakovcic in 2005. In 2007, the business was purchased by the owners of The Afterdark, a bar and live music venue in High Street, Northcote.

Music
The current owners, Singajaya Unlayati, Liam Matthews and Joel Morrison consolidated and developed the bar as a music venue showcasing local and international bands and artists in the musical genres rock, country, folk, experimental, punk, post-punk, heavy metal and hardcore, amongst others.

The venue continues to host many independent local, Australian and international acts, including Blag Dahlia (The Dwarves), Charlie Parr, Okkerville River, Cash Savage and the Last Drinks, Graveyard Train, C.W. Stoneking, Six Ft Hick, The Nation Blue, The Meanies, Children Collide, Delaney Davidson, Mikelangelo & The Tin Star, Spod, Little John, Eddy Current Suppression Ring, Kim Salmon, and Dave Graney.

Community Involvement
The Old Bar has also hosted fundraising events for wider causes, including flood relief event Banana-peel and a month-long string of benefit shows, including live broadcasts of radio show 'Burning Vinyl' for local Community Radio station 3CR. The bar also hosts a popular weekly craft evening on Monday nights during winter, known as "Crotchety Knitwits", which focuses on crotchet and knitting.

Legal Issues
The Old Bar, along with many inner city Melbourne music venues, faced noise and licensing restrictions imposed by local and state authorities in the past few years. Noise complaints from local residents, especially in new housing developments in the immediate vicinity forced the current owners to renovate in order to reduce ambient noise escaping from the venue. Following the Tote closure in 2010, Liam Matthews, one of the current owners, voiced an opinion, along with other venue operators, that local and state restrictions on licensed live music venues made it difficult for continued operation of such venues in the City of Yarra, at a public meeting. He indicated a strong and unfair emphasis on existing business owners to comply to new development in the City.

Old Bar Unicorns
The legendary Old Bar Unicorns take the field in the annual Renegade Pub Football League, a grassroots, inclusive and mixed-gendered Australian rules football competition played between teams put forward by several inner city Melbourne music venues. Other participants include the Tote Hotel, the Labor in Vain Hotel, Some Velvet Morning, The Workers Club, Bar Open and Lomond Barracudas. RPFL games can attract over 500 spectators (and a lot of dogs), with DJs playing from the stands and snags and beers available for purchase. While there are no finals or premiership, competition is fierce but friendly. The RPFL has a long and compelling history and has moved homes several times since it began many years ago. In 2015 the league moved to its new home at Victoria Park, Abbottsford.

Awards and nominations

National Live Music Awards
The National Live Music Awards (NLMAs) are a broad recognition of Australia's diverse live industry, celebrating the success of the Australian live scene. The awards commenced in 2016.

|-
|2017
| The Old Bar
| Victorian Live Venue of the Year
| 
|-

Music Victoria Awards
The Music Victoria Awards are an annual awards night celebrating Victorian music. They commenced in 2006. The award for Best Venue was introduced in 2016.

! 
|-
| Music Victoria Awards of 2016
| The Old Bar
| Best Venue (Under 500 Capacity)
| 
|rowspan="5"| 
|-
| Music Victoria Awards of 2017
| The Old Bar
| Best Venue (Under 500 Capacity)
| 
|-
| Music Victoria Awards of 2018
| The Old Bar
| Best Venue (Under 500 Capacity)
| 
|-
| Music Victoria Awards of 2019
| The Old Bar
| Best Venue (Under 500 Capacity)
| 
|-
| Music Victoria Awards of 2020
| The Old Bar
| Best Venue (Under 500 Capacity)
| 
|-

See also
Music of Melbourne
Fitzroy, Victoria

References

External links
Official Website

Music venues in Melbourne
Punk rock venues
Nightclubs in Melbourne